Gerri Major (1894–1984) was an African-American woman who lived in Harlem during a career that stretched from the 1920s through the 1970s. She was successful in a number of overlapping vocations, including journalist, editor, newscaster, publicist, public health official, author and community leader. An article celebrating her 80th birthday stated that "Gerri was definitely one of the 'new Negroes' of the early 20th Century," adding that by the end of the 1930s she had become "one of the best known black women in America."

During World War I, she was a major in the American Red Cross. Thereafter, she became a society columnist and editor for African American newspapers in her home city of New York as well as in Pittsburgh, Chicago and Baltimore. In 1936, a newspaper reporter said her talent for writing vivid prose, her editing skill and her ability to maintain a wide circle of influential friends brought her fame and gave her "a unique position similar to that of an arbiter over the local social set." At the time of her death in 1984, she held joint positions as associate editor of Jet and senior staff editor of Ebony magazine.

During all of her adult life, she was an active participant in civic organizations that worked to improve the health, education and general well-being of New York's African American community, and for 10 years (from 1936 to 1946) was a publicity specialist for the Central Harlem Health District.

Parents and immediate family 

Major was born on July 29, 1894, in her parents' home on Wentworth Avenue at the western border of the Douglas section of Chicago's Bronzeville neighborhood. Her father was Herbert Hodges and her mother was Mae Powell Hodges. Major reported that her mother's grandfather had migrated from North Carolina to Indiana seeking freedom. Soon after her mother died while giving birth to her, she was adopted by her mother's sister, Maud Lawrence, and her husband David. The Lawrence family had sufficient wealth to give Major an extravagant debutante ball. While yet unmarried, Major kept Hodges as her family name.

On December 15, 1917, Major married H. Binga Dismond in a military ceremony at Camp Logan in Houston. They were divorced in 1933 but remained cordial. In 1942 she married musician Gilbert Holland, a baritone whose voice was heard frequently on radio programs of the 1930s. Her last marriage was to a prominent mortician from Atlantic City, New Jersey, John Richard Major. The ceremony took place in Buenos Aires during a trip they took to South America, probably in 1946. This was her third marriage and his fourth. She was widowed by 1953 and did not remarry during the remaining three decades of her life.

Other names

Major's first name, Geraldyn, was sometimes (wrongly) given as Geraldyne or Geraldine. Her nickname, Gerri, was sometimes given as Jerry or Gerry. While married to H. Binga Dismond she was known as Geraldyn Dismond, Mrs. H. Binga Dismond, or (rarely) Geraldyn Hodges Dismond. During her brief marriage to Gilbert Holland she was known as Geraldyn Holland, Geraldyn Hodges Holland, or Geraldyn Dismond Holland. After marrying John Richard Major, she was called Geraldyn Major, Geraldyn Hodges Major, and Geraldyn Dismond Major. During the last three decades of her life her name was usually rendered as Gerri Major. During her marriage to H. Binga Dismond, she sometimes called herself and was sometimes called "La Dismond." In writing the "Social Whirl" column for the Afro-American she called herself simply Gerry.

Early life and education 
Major was born in Chicago on July 29, 1894. Her birth name was Geraldyn Hodges. When her mother died giving birth to her, Major's father arranged for her adoption by an aunt and uncle who lived nearby. In a biographic sketch published in 1927, Major's first husband explained that her father was "overcome by the sudden loss of his wife ... [and] never forgave the innocent cause of his bereavement." Following elementary school, she attended Wendell Phillips High School and subsequently was awarded a work-study scholarship at the University of Chicago, from which she graduated with a Bachelor in Philosophy degree in 1915.  On October 8th 1913, while being a university student, she chartered the Beta Chapter of Alpha Kappa Alpha sorority, along with 4 other college women. 

In the summer months after her graduation from college, Major studied at Hampton Institute and during the next school year she taught dramatic art and physical culture at Lincoln Institute, an African American college in Jefferson City, Missouri. Not liking the situation there, she returned to Chicago to enter a two-year program at Chicago Normal School so that she could qualify to teach elementary school in that city. In the fall of 1917, Major served as a teacher-in-training or "cadet" in the Chicago public school system. In December of that year, she interrupted her progress toward becoming a Chicago school teacher in order to marry H. Binga Dismond, whom she had met at the University of Chicago. The ceremony took place at Camp Logan in Houston, Texas, where Dismond was training for service in the Army. During American participation in World War I, while Dismond served in France, Major became a Red Cross nurse in Chicago, leaving that organization in 1918 with the rank of major.

In 1919, Major taught at the Stephen A. Douglas Elementary School in Chicago, the same school she had attended as a child. In his biographic sketch of 1927, her husband noted that it was a distinctive honor to be appointed school clerk as well as teacher since "95 per cent of the teachers were non-Aframerican." She left the teaching profession in 1923 when she and her husband moved to Manhattan. She later said she found herself with nothing to do in New York and was "positively miserable" until 1925 when she participated in a fundraising effort for the National Association for the Advancement of Colored People. Early in March of that year, she composed and distributed a public announcement for the annual NAACP dance in Harlem's Manhattan Casino. The release, which appeared in the New York Age on March 7, led to the job offer that would prove to be the starting point for her career in journalism.

Later life 

During the course of a long career, Major was a journalist, editor, newscaster, publicist, public health official, author, and community leader.

Journalist 
The press release she distributed to publicize the NAACP dance caught the eye of Floyd J. Calvin, the New York editor for an influential African-American newspaper, the Pittsburgh Courier, who subsequently named Major as the paper's New York social editor. The paper's announcement of her appointment included a photograph showing her elegantly dressed and posed. The announcement called Major a leader in Harlem society and a "prime favorite in Gotham's best circles." Major's first piece for the Courier, which appeared over the byline, Mrs. H. Binga Dismond, reported on plans for the Urban League's costume ball to be held in November 1925. From 1925 to 1927, Major wrote a weekly column called "New York Society" in which she reported the doings of prominent members of the African American community. In 1927, Major began a new column called "Through the Lorgnette of Geraldyn Dismond" which, instead of New York society news, contained essays and reviews on theater, books and cultural topics. Soon afterward she began writing a weekly column of New York social news called "In New York Town" for the Chicago Bee, and the following year (1928), she started yet another society column, this one called "New York Social Whirl" appearing in the Baltimore Afro-American. She continued to write for the Chicago Bee and the Afro-American through the end of the 1930s. In 1933, she worked as writer and editor for the short-lived Harlem Daily Citizen, and between 1927 and 1931, in addition to her other news work, she was a writer and editor for the Inter-State Tattler for which she wrote columns called "Social Snapshots of Geraldyn Dismond" and "Between Puffs by Lady Nicotine." She subsequently served a four-year stint as columnist for the New York Age following which, from 1939 to 1952 she was a columnist and editor for the New York Amsterdam News. In 1953, she began a long career as writer and editor for two sister magazines: the monthly, Ebony, and the weekly, Jet.

Editor 
Major's first editorial job was New York social editor of the Pittsburgh Courier. While still contributing extensive new content, she performed more extensive editorial work from 1928 to 1932 for the Inter-State Tattler. In 1930 a reporter said the Tattler's name was "synonymous with Geraldyn Dismond." In 1933 and 1934 Major edited the Daily Citizen during its brief life. Subsequently, she was both social reporter and society editor of the New York Age, and during the 1940s was women's page editor for the New York Amsterdam News. In 1953 she began a twenty-five-year career at Ebony as writer and society editor. She later became associate editor, and, in 1967, senior staff editor, the position she held at her death in 1984. In 1953 she also joined Jet as writer and society editor, later becoming associate editor, a position she retained until her death. She worked in the New York offices that were jointly maintained by both magazines. The year that she began with Ebony and Jet she was sent to England to cover the coronation of Queen Elizabeth II.

Radio announcer and promoter 

Between 1928 and 1930 Major wrote and presented a review of current events during a New York radio program that aired each week on Sunday afternoon. This made her, as one source put it, "the first Negro woman commercial radio announcer." The program was the "Negro Achievement Hour", a variety show featuring talks and music that was carried on two local stations, WABC and WEVD. In addition to newscasting, Major was a program director for the show. The program ceased after its 85th week in August 1929. In 1930 Major helped to establish a broadcasting studio in Harlem, became the organization's secretary, and announced many of its programs on air.

Publicist 

In 1928 Major became one of the first, if not the very first, African American women to take on the role of publicist. Located in Harlem on 135th Street the Geraldyn Dismond Bureau of Specialized Publicity developed an extensive mailing list and established its credentials by landing a contract to publicize an all-African-American stage production called "Africana" starring Ethel Waters.

Health educator 

In 1933 Major became executive director of a health center on Lenox Avenue in Harlem that was operated by the United Health Association. The following year she was chosen by the Newspaper Guild to work on a welfare publicity project in the Central Harlem Health District. In 1936 she passed civil service examinations and oral interviews to become a publicity assistant in the New York Bureau of Health Education and Information, a job she continued to perform until 1946. A news report on Major's appointment said her performance on written and oral civil service examinations and her prior experience resulted in her selection and noted that she was the first African American to be hired into the position. It said, "Her extraordinarily clever style of writing plus the advantage of a wide circle of friends in the elite circles wherever she went, placed her at the top of the society writers in short order. As Society Editor of the Interstate Tattler, prior to its discontinuing several years ago, she held a unique position similar to that of an arbiter over the local social set and it was during that time that her fame, both as a writer and hostess, is said to have reached its peak."

Author 

In 1929 Major wrote an article for Close Up containing analysis and criticism of motion pictures. Calling itself an "international magazine devoted to film art", the journal was an avant garde publication that investigated the cultural aspects of cinema beyond the medium's obvious role in entertaining its audiences. Her article was "The Negro Actor and the American Movies." In 1976 Major co-authored a book, Black Society, giving the histories of prominent African American families from colonial times to the twentieth century.

Community leader 

In October 1925, the biographic sketch that accompanied Major's appointed New York social editor for the Pittsburgh Courier referred to her not just as "a leader in Harlem society" but also as "a willing worker for charity and social uplift agencies, [who] has contributed much to the betterment of the community by her many and varied community interests." A month later, as a mark of her social standing, she was runner up in nationwide balloting for "Queen of the Classic" on the occasion of the annual football game between Lincoln and Howard Universities.  A year later, Major figured prominently within a group of "representative New York society leaders" in text accompanying a news photo headed "New York Social Leaders Plan Brilliant Season". The photo's caption listed some of her many positions in civic organizations. In 1930 she was included among "the Four Hundred" in an article that drew a sharp contrast between the "Harlem of the cabarets" frequented by thrill-seeking white New Yorkers and the "ebony society" to which Major belonged, where fashionable men and women in "tail coats and formal evening gowns" attended  "exclusive functions for the brown upper crust" to which "a few white guests" might be invited."  In 1939 she served as chair of the program committee for participation of African Americans in the American Common section of the 1939 New York World's Fair. In 1951 Major was guest of honor and "woman of the year" at a charity ball held by a New York women's club. In 1952 she was cited for "humane deeds performed in behalf of her community" by a New York impresario, Freddie Fulton. Her obituary in Ebony listed some of the civic organizations to which Major belonged and mentioned thirty honors and citations that she had received.

Major traveled overseas during the 1940s and 1950s, including trips to Egypt, Brazil, and Argentina. Her wedding to John Majors, her third and final marriage, took place in Buenos Aires.

Political affiliations

In 1928 and 1930 she was reported to be a member of the Communist Party. Asked about political affiliations in 1928 she said she would not join the National Colored Women's Democratic League and had no ties to the Democratic Party. She said she had adopted the principles of Communism because she believed that both the Republican and Democratic Parties "uphold the practices of Jim-Crowism, disenfranchisement, and race discrimination by which Negroes are degraded and oppressed."  By 1984, however, she had become an active member of the Democratic Party.

Notes

References 

20th-century African-American women writers
20th-century American women writers
1894 births
1984 deaths
University of Chicago alumni
Chicago State University alumni
Lincoln University (Missouri) faculty
Journalists from Illinois
Writers from Chicago
Women's page journalists
American women journalists
20th-century American journalists
20th-century African-American writers
American women academics